Abū Aḥmad ʿAbd Allāh ibn Muḥammad ibn Ismāʿīl (born 766–828 CE/149–212 AH in Salamiyah, Syria; Imamate 809–828 CE/193–212 AH), known by Isma'ilis as Aḥmad al-Wāfī and sometimes incorrectly identified with ʿAbd Allāh ibn Maymūn al-Qaddāḥ, was the eighth Isma'ili Imam. He was the son and successor of the seventh Imam, Muhammad ibn Isma'il. He was called al-Wāfī "true to his word".

As the Imam, he was the supreme spiritual leader of the Isma'ili community from his appointment until his death. The Nizari and Musta'li trace their Imamate lines from him and his descendants who founded the Fatimid Caliphate. For protection against his real Imam position, he was known as "Attar" (due to his profession in drug and medicine). He was succeeded by his son, Ahmad ibn Abd Allah (Muhammad al-Taqi). With the death of Ja'far al-Sadiq in 765 (148 AH), Isma'il in 775 (158 AH) and Muhammad in 813 (197 AH), the Isma'ili Imams were impelled to hide; this first occultation lasted from 813 to 882 (197–268 AH).

The eighth to tenth Isma'ili Imams were hidden from the public because of threats from the Abbasid Caliphate and were known by their nicknames. However, the Dawoodi Bohra in their religious text, Taqqarub, claim to have the true names of all 21 imams in sequence including the "hidden" imams: the eighth Imam Abd Allah ibn Muhammad (Ahmad al-Wafi), the ninth Imam Ahmad ibn Abd Allah (Muhammad al-Taqi), and the tenth Imam Husayn ibn Ahmad (Abd Allah al-Radi).

Gallery

See also
 List of Isma'ili imams
 Family tree linking Prophets to Shi'ite Imams

References 

 

Ismaili imams
766 births
828 deaths

9th-century Arabs